Oszyk is a Polish coat of arms. It was used by the Sienkiewicz family.

History

Blazon

The Coat of arms of Oszyk is a Coat of arms of Łabędź variation.

Notable bearers

Notable bearers of this coat of arms include:

 Henryk Sienkiewicz
 Józef Sienkiewicz

Gallery

See also
 Polish heraldry
 Heraldic family
 List of Polish nobility coats of arms

Bibliography
 Juliusz Karol Ostrowski: Księga herbowa rodów polskich. T. 2. Warszawa: Główny skład księgarnia antykwarska B. Bolcewicza, 1897–1906, s. 249.
 Juliusz Karol Ostrowski: Księga herbowa rodów polskich. T. 1. Warszawa: Główny skład księgarnia antykwarska B. Bolcewicza, 1897–1906, s. 241.

Oszyk